Elaris AG is a German automotive company founded in 2020 in Grünstadt, Rhineland-Palatinate specializing in marketing Chinese electric vehicles.

History
Elaris was founded in 2020 in the town of Grünstadt, with the company's first models, the DYO microcar (based on the Dorcen E20) and the Leo compact SUV (based on the Dorcen G60S) launching in May 2021. Later that month, the Skyworth EV6-based Beo mid-size SUV was launched. In June, a second microcar based on the Zhidou D2 (called simply Elaris Zhidou) was revealed. This model was later renamed in August to Elaris Pio.

Models
The following is a list of models sold by Elaris:

 Beo (2021–present), an electric mid-size SUV based on the Skyworth EV6
 DYO(2021–present), an electric microcar based on the Dorcen E20
 Pio (2021–present), an electric microcar based on the Zhidou D2

External links
 Official website

References

German companies established in 2020
Car manufacturers of Germany
Companies based in Rhineland-Palatinate
Manufacturing companies established in 2020